The Destructors is a 1968 American science fiction film directed by Francis D. Lyon and written by Arthur C. Pierce and Larry E. Jackson. The film stars Richard Egan, Patricia Owens, John Ericson, Michael Ansara, Joan Blackman and David Brian. Filmed in 1966, the film was released in January 1968, by Feature Film Corp. of America.

Plot

Cast    
Richard Egan as Dan Street
Patricia Owens as Charlie
John Ericson as Dutch Holland
Michael Ansara as Count Mario Romano
Joan Blackman as Stassa
David Brian as Hogan
Johnny Seven as Spaniard
Khigh Dhiegh as King Chou Lai
Gregory Morton as Dr. Frazer
John Howard as Ernest Bushnell
Michael Dugan as Parkhouse
Jim Adams as Agent Wayne
Eddie Firestone as Dr. Barnes
Olan Soule as Mace 
Linda Kirk as Prissy
Rick Traeger as Hans Gertmann
King Moody as Patch
Cal Currens as King's Bodyguard
Jayne Massey as Operator Suzie
Tom McDonald as Agent Dewey
Horace Brown as Skipper 
Douglas Kennedy as General
Walter Reed as Admiral
James Seay as Sec. of Defense

References

External links
 

1968 films
1960s spy films
American science fiction films
1960s science fiction films
Films directed by Francis D. Lyon
United Pictures Corporation
1960s English-language films
1960s American films